Lunnville is an unincorporated community in Yamhill County, Oregon, United States.

References

Unincorporated communities in Yamhill County, Oregon
Unincorporated communities in Oregon